Bel Bolide was an American-bred Thoroughbred racehorse. He campaigned in Europe for three years, winning the Gimcrack Stakes in 1980. He had his greatest success when he returned to the United States, winning the Del Mar Handicap, Tanforan Handicap, Carleton F. Burke Handicap and American Handicap.

Background
Bel Bolide was a chestnut horse with a white blaze and four white stockings bred in Kentucky by George A. Bolas. He was sired by Bold Bidder, who won 13 races and also sired the Kentucky Derby winners Spectacular Bid and Cannonade. As a yearling he was offered for sale and bought for $310,000 by representatives of the Saudi Prince Khalid Abdullah. The colt was sent to Britain to be trained by Jeremy Tree at Beckhampton in Wiltshire.

Racing career

European career
Bel Bolide raced in Britain as a two-year-old in 1980, winning three of his six races including the Group Two Gimcrack Stakes. He also finished second in the Middle Park Stakes and the Richmond Stakes and third in the Coventry Stakes. Bel Bolide failed to win in five races in 1981, but finished third to To-Agori-Mou in both the 2000 Guineas and the St James's Palace Stakes. After failing to win in four races in 1982 he was sent to race in the United States.

American career
During his racing career in North America, Bel Bolide was trained by John Gosden. In 1983 he won five of his seven races including the Del Mar Handicap, Tanforan Handicap and Carleton F. Burke Handicap. In the following year he ran six times and won the American Handicap.

Pedigree

References

1978 racehorse births
Racehorses bred in Kentucky
Racehorses trained in the United Kingdom
Racehorses trained in the United States
Thoroughbred family 20